Vermont Route 108 (VT 108) is a north–south state highway in northern Vermont, United States. Its southern terminus is at VT 100 in Stowe, and its northern terminus is at the Canada–US border in Franklin, where it continues into Quebec past the West Berkshire–Frelighsburg Border Crossing as Route 237.

Route description

VT 108 passes through the area of the Mount Mansfield State Forest. It starts in Stowe and goes through Smugglers' Notch to Jeffersonville. The road cuts through Mount Mansfield. The road is very steep and winding, making it impossible to plow in the winter, so the road is closed between the State Forest access parking lot and Smugglers' Notch Resort, usually from late October until May. Tractor-trailers are barred from this section of the route, though several trucks per year attempt traveling through and wind up getting stuck, incurring fines of over $2000. Large straight trucks, buses and RVs are strongly encouraged to use alternate routes year-round. However, skiers come from alternate routes to cross-country, downhill ski, and snow mobile in the Smuggler's Notch Resort. Along the road, there are small parking areas where rock climbing and hiking are popular.

Major intersections

References

External links

108
Transportation in Franklin County, Vermont
Transportation in Lamoille County, Vermont